Corteva, Inc. (also known as Corteva Agriscience) is a major American agricultural chemical and seed company that was the agricultural unit of DowDuPont prior to being spun off as an independent public company.

DowDuPont announced the Corteva name in February 2018, saying that it was "derived from a combination of words meaning 'heart' and 'nature.'" Corteva became a public company on June 3, 2019, when DowDuPont distributed Corteva shares to its shareholders.

History
The DowDuPont agricultural businesses that became Corteva had revenue of over $14 billion in 2017, which would have placed the company in the Fortune 500 for that year. A major part of the company is Pioneer Hi-Bred International, which DuPont purchased in 1999.

In February 2020, Corteva, then the largest US-based manufacturer of the pesticide chlorpyrifos, announced that it would cease chlorpyrifos production by the end of 2020.

In August 2022, Bayer CropScience sued Corteva alleging that they breached contractual obligations related to the development and commercialization of E3 soybeans. Corteva filed a suit of their own hours later, alleging that Bayer infringed upon one of its patents on a gene used in Enlist® Corn, which encodes a unique herbicide resistance enzyme and is part of their Enlist® Weed Control System.

Criticism
In March 2019 Corteva was criticised by the Humane Society of the United States for testing a new fungicide on beagle dogs as such testing is required by regulatory authorities. It has said the company will "proactively engage with government officials to minimize or cease animal studies, where possible, and once the industry receives confirmation that animal testing is no longer required, it will cease testing immediately and make every effort to re-home the animals" after it was reported that researchers intended to put the animals to death.

References

External links
 

Agriculture companies established in 2019
DuPont
American companies established in 2019
Companies listed on the New York Stock Exchange
Companies based in Indianapolis
Corporate spin-offs